Jadavpur University Campus Stadium is a multi-purpose stadium located in Salt Lake City Campus of Jadavpur University, Jadavpur, Bengal. The ground is mainly used for organizing matches of football, cricket and other sports. The main ground at the Salt Lake campus has been leased out to the Cricket Association of Bengal and it often plays host to inter- and intrastate cricket matches. The stadium was established in 2004 when the ground hosted Ranji Trophy match between Bengal cricket team and Karnataka cricket team Since then, it hosted four more First-class cricket matches. 

The stadium is regular host of List A and Twenty20 cricket matches

References

External links 

 cricketarchive
 cricinfo
 Jadavpur University

Cricket grounds in West Bengal
Sports venues in West Bengal
Jadavpur University
Sports venues completed in 2004
2004 establishments in West Bengal